Okuni is a rural locality (a selo) in Chernyansky District, Belgorod Oblast, Russia. The population was 328 as of 2010. There are 8 streets.

Geography 
Okuni is located 11 km north of Chernyanka (the district's administrative centre) by road. Volokonovka is the nearest rural locality.

References 

Rural localities in Chernyansky District